Carcas is a possible misspelling of:

 Caracas, a city in Venezuela
 Carcass, a dead body